Seef is a commercial district in Manama, the capital city of Bahrain.

Etymology
The word 'seef' means coast or shore in the Gulf Arabic lexicon, similar to 'sahel'.

History
Seef is a result of active land reclamation work starting in the 1980s, which has dramatically changed the Bahrain coastline. Surrounded on three sides by the sea, Seef is a district dominated by office blocks, luxury apartments, hotels and multiple shopping malls.

Rents in Seef (alongside Amwaj Islands) are reportedly the highest in the entire country. Seef is fast developing into a business centre with many local and multinational companies building their offices in the area. Seef is the location of the Almoayyed Tower, which was the tallest building in the country (now replaced by the Bahrain Financial Harbour).

See also 
 Seef Mall
 Bahrain City Centre
 List of tallest buildings and structures in Bahrain
 List of tourist attractions in Bahrain

References 

Neighborhoods of Manama
Populated coastal places in Bahrain